A Summer Dress is a 1996 short film directed by François Ozon about a flagging gay relationship that is refueled in an unexpected way.

Plot
Luc (Frédéric Mangenot) spends his holiday by the sea with his slightly older and decidedly more effeminate boyfriend, Sébastien (Sébastien Charles). At the house they have rented, Sébastien's flamboyant dancing and preening frustrates Luc, who rebukes him that the neighbors might see. Irritated, Luc goes off on his bicycle to the beach, hoping to find some solitude.

On the beach, Luc is finally alone and goes skinny dipping. Afterwards, he sunbathes in the nude and meets Lucia (Lucia Sanchez), a Spanish tourist about his age, who, after some flirtatious conversation, invites Luc to accompany her into the nearby wood for a tryst. Luc, though somewhat bashful, obliges with little hesitation. After having sex, Lucia learns that Luc is erotically involved with Sébastien and has never been with a woman before.

The two return to the beach to find that Luc's clothes have been stolen. Lucia lends Luc her summer dress so that he won't have to return home completely naked. Wearing a woman's dress improves Luc's mood as a car honks its horn after him on the ride back. He returns to the cabin with a smile and a renewed sense of freedom. Luc surprises Sébastien when he comes in. After a few amused remarks about the dress (Luc flirtatiously refers to himself as a "beautiful girl"), the two have passionate sex in the kitchen. The dress is partially torn in the act.

The next day, Luc mends the summer dress and brings it back to Lucia, who is just leaving. However, she refuses to accept it, coyly suggesting that it may come in handy in the future. She kisses Luc goodbye. The final frame shows Luc watching her leave, the dress wrapped around his neck and fluttering in the sea breeze.

Reception 
The film won awards at the Brest European Short Film Festival and the L.A. Outfest.

Thibault Shilt of Senses of Cinema has cited the film as an example of a trend in recent French cinema of presenting sexual fluidity in "new, innovative ways."

References

External links 
 
 

1996 films
Cross-dressing in film
Gay-related films
Films about infidelity
Films directed by François Ozon
French LGBT-related films
French short films
LGBT-related short films
Male bisexuality in film
Films about dresses
1990s French films